MacBreak was an internet television show hosted by Leo Laporte, Kendra Arimoto, Alex Lindsay, iJustine and Emery Wells from TWiT.tv and the Pixel Corps. The podcast was dedicated to Apple's Macintosh computers and other Apple products such as the iPod.

MacBreak was the first podcast in 1080p high definition format, with the release of an episode on the TWiT web site in the format. According to Leo Laporte on This Week in Tech, MacBreak caused bandwidth problems for its service provider, Libsyn.

MacBreak is a production of the TWiT.tv network in association with Pixel Corps. It is filmed in San Francisco, California on a greenscreen set at the San Francisco School of Digital Filmmaking. Each episode, the live-action greenscreen footage is keyed and composited over a virtual 3D set by members of the Pixel Corps. This process is explained in the "Road to 1080p" episodes.

Starting in April 2007 with the release of MacBreak #65, "MacBreak Minutes" hosted by Merlin Mann and Kenji Kato began to appear along with full MacBreak episodes. MacBreak Minutes are short tips that consisted of an application or tool featured in a one-minute condensed video.

Regular MacBreak guests/alternate host have included Weezer drummer Patrick Wilson, Kenji Kato, Mark Spencer, Craig Syverson, Cali Lewis, Don McAllister and Dr. Kiki Sanford.

As of MacBreak #29, the opening titles were changed to reflect the new lineup of hosts. Amber MacArthur was no longer listed, replaced by Merlin Mann and Kendra Arimoto. iJustine became a host on January 12, 2007. The latest episode was produced May 3, 2011.

MacBreak Weekly 

A spin-off called MacBreak Weekly was started on August 13, 2006. It distributed in audio and video formats and features many of the video version hosts as well as special guests. The intro theme is made by Ashley Witt at tenthauser.com. The usual "Mac pundits," as they refer to themselves, are Leo Laporte, Rene Ritchie, Alex Lindsay, and Andy Ihnatko. The content differs from MacBreak in that the discussion mainly covers Apple related news from the previous week. Other segments include a "Pick of the Week", where the hosts discuss various software and hardware they find useful.

Sections and features

There used to be a "Whine" section where the hosts complain about certain features of various Mac OS X applications they wish would be improved. A running joke is that Alex Lindsay tends to pick products with exorbitant price tags, and thus the panel has created a unit of currency, the “Alex” which is equivalent to the retail price of the current version of Adobe Photoshop (approximately $700.00 US). It is sometimes used as a unit of price for the "Picks of the Week" segment, while free items are said to be “zero Alexes”. MacBreak Weekly 125 saw the introduction of two new units of price; the "Scott" is equal to 11 "Alexes", and the "Great Scott" is equal to 10 "Scotts." The show is often very casual and relaxed, and the hosts get off topic quite a bit which seems to contribute to the overall tone of the show. A recent feature on the show includes a special jingle first introduced by Merlin Mann and then supplied as a full blown song titled "Rathole!" which is played when the conversation veers very far off from the original topic. Another recurring theme is Leo Laporte's habit of buying Apple products just before they are discontinued, the price cut or the product changes. This started when he bought a Power Mac G4 Cube on the day it was discontinued. (This was referenced in episode 12; "Smokin'") It has become a joke throughout the shows, mostly between Merlin Mann and Scott Bourne. Due to other commitments Merlin Mann has been absent for most shows since episode 104, although he appeared in episode 122.

The podcast has show notes published on the TWiT Wiki, under the MacBreak Weekly section.

See also 
List of technology podcasts

References

External links
 – official site
 – official site
 – YouTube channel containing clips of MacBreak; now inactive

Video podcasts
Technology podcasts
2006 podcast debuts 
2011 podcast endings